The Ottoman women's magazine Demet (meaning "floral bouquet" in English) was founded in 1908 in Istanbul, two weeks after the proclamation of the Second Constitutional Era. Altogether, seven issues exist, they were published once a week. Editor-in-chief and publisher was Celāl Sāhir (1883–1935). Even though the magazine was aimed at women, the editorial team of the first two issues was made up exclusively of men, such as Mehmet Akif Ersoy (1873–1936), Selim Sırrı Tarcan (1874–1957), and Enis Avni (1886-1958). Among the female writers were later Halide Edib Adıvar (1884–1964), Nigar Bint-i Osman (1862–1918), and İsmet Hakkı Hanım. In addition to literary and scientific articles, what interested the female readers most were political publications. Besides Kadınlar Dünyası (1913–1921), Maḥāsin (1908–1910), and Kadın (1908–1910), is considered one of the first and most important women's magazines in the Second Constitutional Era.

References

Further reading
 Ruth, Haerkötter (1992): Maḥāsin. Ein Beispiel für die osmanische Frauenpresse der Zweiten konstitutionellen Periode, Wiesbaden: Harrassowitz.

1908 establishments in the Ottoman Empire
1908 disestablishments in the Ottoman Empire
Cultural magazines published in Turkey
Defunct magazines published in Turkey
Magazines established in 1908
Magazines disestablished in 1908
Magazines published in Istanbul
Turkish-language magazines
Weekly magazines published in Turkey